Dimitrios Kottaras (born 11 August 1975) is a Greek former professional footballer who played as a goalkeeper.

Career
Born in Goudi, Kottaras began playing football in the youth side of Trikala F.C. He joined the professional team in July 1999, and made 18 Alpha Ethniki appearances in his first season. He would appear in another four top flight matches for Egaleo F.C. during a two-year stint with the club.

In the 2009–10 season, Kottaras started playing for Pierikos F.C. but moved in January 2010 to Panserraikos F.C. In July 2010, he signed a two-year contract with Ethnikos Asteras F.C. after achieving the promotion to the Greek Super League with Panserraikos F.C.

References

External links
Profile at epae.org

1975 births
Living people
Trikala F.C. players
Egaleo F.C. players
Kalamata F.C. players
Panserraikos F.C. players
Pierikos F.C. players
Ethnikos Asteras F.C. players
Vyzas F.C. players
Apollon Smyrnis F.C. players
A.O. Glyfada players
Association football goalkeepers
Footballers from Athens
Greek footballers